Iliamna latibracteata is an uncommon species of flowering plant in the mallow family known by the common names California globe mallow and California wild hollyhock.

It is endemic to the coniferous forests of the Klamath Mountains, in northwestern California and southwestern Oregon

Description
Iliamna latibracteata is a large perennial herb growing a hairy stem from a woody caudex to heights between one and two meters.

It produces palmate leaves with generally 5 or 7 pointed lobes on long, slender petioles, each leaf up to 20 centimeters long.

Flowers grow in the leaf axils, singly or in small clusters. Each flower is cup-shaped with five pink-lavender petals 2 to 3 centimeters long.

External links
Jepson Manual Treatment of Iliamna latibracteata
USDA Plants Profile
Iliamna latibracteata — UC Photos gallery

Malveae
Flora of the Klamath Mountains
Flora of California
Flora of Oregon
Endemic flora of the United States
Flora without expected TNC conservation status